Marie François Xavier Bichat (14 November 1771 – 22 July 1802) was a French anatomist and pathologist, known as the father of modern histology. Although he worked without a microscope, Bichat distinguished 21 types of elementary tissues from which the organs of the human body are composed. He was also "the first to propose that tissue is a central element in human anatomy, and he considered organs as collections of often disparate tissues, rather than as entities in themselves".

Although Bichat was "hardly known outside the French medical world" at the time of his early death, forty years later "his system of histology and pathological anatomy had taken both the French and English medical worlds by storm." The Bichatian tissue theory was "largely instrumental in the rise to prominence of hospital doctors" as opposed to empiric therapy, as "diseases were now defined in terms of specific lesions in various tissues, and this lent itself to a classification and a list of diagnoses".

Early life and training

Bichat was born in Thoirette, Franche-Comté. His father was Jean-Baptiste Bichat, a physician who had trained in Montpellier and was Bichat's first instructor. His mother was Jeanne-Rose Bichat, his father's wife and cousin. He was the eldest of four children. He entered the college of Nantua, and later studied at Lyon. He made rapid progress in mathematics and the physical sciences, but ultimately devoted himself to the study of anatomy and surgery under the guidance of Marc-Antoine Petit (1766–1811), chief surgeon at the Hôtel-Dieu of Lyon.

At the beginning of September 1793, Bichat was designated to serve as a surgeon with the Army of the Alps in the service of the surgeon Buget at the hospital of Bourg. He went home in March 1794, then moved to Paris, where he became a pupil of Pierre-Joseph Desault at the Hôtel-Dieu, "who was so strongly impressed with his genius that he took him into his house and treated him as his adopted son." He took active part in Desault's work, at the same time pursuing his own research in anatomy and physiology.

The sudden death of Desault in 1795 was a severe blow to Bichat. His first task was to discharge the obligations he owed his benefactor by contributing to the support of his widow and her son and by completing the fourth volume of Desault's Journal de Chirurgie, which was published the following year. In 1796, he and several other colleagues also formally founded the Société Médicale d'Émulation, which provided an intellectual platform for debating problems in medicine.

Lecturing and research
In 1797, Bichat began a course of anatomical demonstrations, and his success encouraged him to extend the plan of his lectures, and boldly to announce a course of operative surgery. At the same time, he was working to reunite and digest in one body the surgical doctrines which Desault had published in various periodical works; of these he composed Œuvres chirurgicales de Desault, ou tableau de sa doctrine, et de sa pratique dans le traitement des maladies externes (1798–1799), a work in which, although he professes only to set forth the ideas of another, he develops them "with the clearness of one who is a master of the subject."

In 1798, he gave in addition a separate course of physiology. A dangerous attack of haemoptysis interrupted his labors for a time; but the danger was no sooner past than he plunged into new engagements with the same ardour as before. Bichat's next book, Traité des membranes (Treatise on Membranes), included his doctrine of tissue pathology with a distinction of 21 different tissues. As worded by A. S. Weber,

His next publication was the Recherches physiologiques sur la vie et la mort (Physiological Researches upon Life and Death, 1800), and it was quickly followed by his Anatomie générale (1801) in four volumes, the work which contains the fruits of his most profound and original researches. He began another work, under the title Anatomie descriptive (1801–1803), in which the organs were arranged according to his peculiar classification of their functions but lived to publish only the first two volumes.

Final years and death

In 1800, Bichat was appointed physician to the Hôtel-Dieu. "He engaged in a series of examinations, with a view to ascertain the changes induced in the various organs by disease, and in less than six months he had opened above six hundred bodies. He was anxious also to determine with more precision than had been attempted before, the effects of remedial agents, and instituted with this view a series of direct experiments which yielded a vast store of valuable material. Towards the end of his life he was also engaged on a new classification of diseases."

On 8 July 1802, Bichat fell in a faint while descending a set of stairs at the Hôtel-Dieu. He had been spending considerable time examining some macerated skin, "and from which, of course, putrid emanations were being sent forth", during which he probably contracted typhoid fever; "the next day he complained of a violent headache; that night, leeches were applied behind his ears; on the 10th, he took an emetic; on the 15th, he passed into a coma and became convulsive." Bichat died on 22 July, aged 30.

Jean-Nicolas Corvisart wrote to the first consul Napoleon Bonaparte:

Ten days after this, the French government caused his name, together with that of Desault, to be inscribed on a memorial plaque at the Hôtel-Dieu.

Bichat was first buried at Sainte-Catherine Cemetery. With the closing of the latter, his remains were transferred to Père Lachaise Cemetery on 16 November 1845, followed by "a cortège of upwards of two thousand persons" after a funeral service at Notre-Dame.

Vitalist theory
Bichat is considered to have been a vitalist, though in no way an anti-experimentalist:

According to Russell C. Maulitz, "of the Montpellier vitalists, the clearest influence on Bichat was probably Théophile de Bordeu (1722–1776), whose widely disseminated writings on the vitalistic interpretation of life fell early into Bichat's hands."

 In his Physiological Researches upon Life and Death (1800), Bichat defined life as "the totality of those set of functions which resist death", adding:

Bichat thought that animals exhibited vital properties which could not be explained through physics or chemistry. In his Physiological Researches, he considered life to be separable into two parts: the organic life (""; also sometimes called the vegetative system) and the animal life ("", or animal system). The organic life was "the life of the heart, intestines, and the other inner organs." As worded by Stanley Finger, "Bichat theorized that this life was regulated through the système des ganglions (the ganglionic nervous system), a collection of small independent 'brains' in the chest cavity." In contrast, animal life "involved symmetrical, harmonious organs, such as the eyes, ears, and limbs. It included habit and memory, and was ruled by the wit and the intellect. This was the function of the brain itself, but it could not exist without the heart, the center of the organic life."

According to A. S. Weber,

Legacy

Bichat's main contribution to medicine and physiology was his perception that the diverse body of organs contain particular tissues or membranes, and he described 21 such membranes, including connective, muscle, and nerve tissue. As he explained in Anatomie générale,

Bichat did not use a microscope because he distrusted it; therefore his analyses did not include any acknowledgement of cellular structure. Nonetheless, he formed an important bridge between the organ pathology of Giovanni Battista Morgagni and the cell pathology of Rudolf Virchow. Bichat "recognized disease as a localized condition that began in specific tissues."

Michel Foucault regarded Bichat as the chief architect in developing the understanding of the human body as the origin of illness, redefining both conceptions of the body and disease. Bichat's figure was of great importance to Arthur Schopenhauer, who wrote of the Recherches physiologiques as "one of the most profoundly conceived works in the whole of French literature."

Honours

A large bronze statue of Bichat by David d'Angers was erected in 1857 in the cour d'honneur of the École de Chirurgie in Paris, with the support of members of the Medical Congress of France which was held in 1845. Bichat is also represented on the Panthéon's pediment, of which the bas-relief is D'Angers' work as well. The name of Bichat is one of the 72 names inscribed on the Eiffel Tower. His name was given to the Bichat–Claude Bernard Hospital.

George Eliot enthusiastically recounted Bichat's career in her 1872 novel Middlemarch. In Madame Bovary (1856), Gustave Flaubert, himself the son of a prominent surgeon, wrote of a physician character who "belonged to the great school of surgery that sprang up around Bichat, to that generation, now extinct, of philosopher-practitioners who, cherishing their art with fanatical passion, exercised it with exaltation and sagacity."

Gallery

Notes

References

Sources

Further reading

External links

 
 
 
 Some places and memories related to Xavier Bichat
 Physiological Researches upon Life and Death by Xavier Bichat (1809)

1771 births
1802 deaths
People from Jura (department)
French physiologists
French anatomists
French pathologists
Burials at Père Lachaise Cemetery
18th-century French writers
18th-century French male writers
19th-century French writers
Vitalists